The Act of the Re-Establishment of the State of Lithuania or Act of March  11 was an independence declaration by Lithuania adopted on March 11, 1990, signed by all members of the Supreme Council of the Republic of Lithuania led by Sąjūdis. The act emphasized restoration and legal continuity of the interwar-period Lithuania, which was occupied by the Soviet Union and annexed in June 1940. In March, 1990, it was the first of the 15 Soviet republics to declare independence, with the rest following suit over the ensuing twenty-one months. These events (part of the broader process dubbed the "parade of sovereignties") lead to the dissolution of the Soviet Union in December 1991.

Background

Loss of independence
After the partitions of the Polish–Lithuanian Commonwealth in the 18th century, Lithuania was part of the Russian Empire. In the aftermath of the Russian Revolution of 1917, the Council of Lithuania, chaired by Jonas Basanavičius, proclaimed the Act of Independence of Lithuania on February 16, 1918. Lithuania enjoyed independence for two decades. In August 1939, the Soviet Union and Nazi Germany signed the Molotov–Ribbentrop Pact dividing Eastern Europe into spheres of influence. The Baltic states (Lithuania, Latvia, and Estonia) were assigned to the Soviet sphere of influence and subsequently were occupied in June 1940 and converted into soviet socialist republics.

In Lithuania's case, President Antanas Smetona left the country rather than accept the occupation.  He did not resign but turned over his presidential duties to Prime Minister Antanas Merkys as per the constitution.  The next day, Merkys declared himself president in his own right. The cabinet confirmed Merkys in office, claiming that Smetona had effectively resigned by leaving the country.

Two days later, under Soviet pressure, Merkys appointed Justas Paleckis, a left-wing journalist and longtime opponent of the Smetona regime, as prime minister.  Merkys then resigned at Moscow's insistence, making Paleckis acting president as well. The Soviets then used the Paleckis government to give the final Soviet takeover the appearance of legality.

The Paleckis government staged a heavily rigged election for a "People's Seimas," in which voters were presented with a single Communist-dominated list. The newly elected People's Seimas met on July 21 with only one piece of business–a resolution declaring Lithuania a Soviet republic and petitioning for admission to the Soviet Union, which carried unanimously. The Soviet Union duly "approved" the request on August 3. Since then, Soviet sources have maintained that Lithuania's petition to join the Soviet Union marked the culmination of a Lithuanian socialist revolution, and thus represented the legitimate desire of the Lithuanian people to join the Soviet Union.
 
The Soviet authorities undertook Sovietization policies: nationalization of all private property, collectivization of agriculture, suppression of the Catholic Church, and the imposition of totalitarian control. At the same time, free education and free national health system were also introduced. The armed anti-Soviet partisans were liquidated by 1953. Approximately 130,000 Lithuanians, dubbed "enemies of the people", were deported into Siberia (see June deportation and March deportation). After the death of Joseph Stalin in 1953, the Soviet Union adopted de-Stalinization policies and ended mass persecutions. Nonviolent resistance continued both in Lithuania and among the Lithuanian diaspora. These movements were secret, illegal, and more focused on social issues, human rights, and cultural affairs rather than political demands.

Independence movements

As Mikhail Gorbachev attempted to revive the economy of the Soviet Union, he introduced glasnost (openness) and perestroika (restructuring).

Gorbachev's political agenda went for great and deep changes within the Soviet government, as such, Gorbachev invited the Soviet public into open and public discussions unseen before.

For the Soviet Lithuanian dissidents and activists, it was a golden opportunity not to be missed, to bring their movements from underground into the public life.

On August 23, 1987 (the 48th anniversary of the Molotov–Ribbentrop Pact), the Lithuanian Liberty League organized the first public protest rally that did not result in arrests.

Encouraged by the non arrests, by mid-1988, a group of 35 intellectuals organized the Sąjūdis Reform Movement with the original goal of supporting, discussing, and implementing Gorbachev's reforms yet short of openly supporting independence from the USSR.

However, Sąjūdis grew in popularity, attracting large crowds to rallies in Vingis Park and therefore radicalizing its agenda, taking advantage of Gorbachev's passiveness.

In 1989, Sąjūdis, not afraid of angering Moscow and causing a violent crackdown, continuously pushed further with its demands: from limited discussions on Gorbachev's reforms, to demand greater say in economic decisions, to political autonomy within the Soviet Union.

By the time of the Baltic Way, a human chain spanning over 600 kilometres (370 mi) across the three Baltic states to mark the 50th anniversary of the Molotov–Ribbentrop Pact, the official goal of Sąjūdis was now independence for Lithuania.

Similar processes happened in other Soviet republics during 1988-1991, collectively known as the "parade of sovereignties" , which were the major factor contributing to the collapse of the Soviet Union.

Democratic election
Parliamentary elections of February 1990 were the first free and democratic elections in Lithuania since 1926. The voters overwhelmingly voted for the candidates endorsed by Sąjūdis, even though the movement did not run as a political party. The result was the first post-war non-communist government. During its first assembly on March 11, 1990, the Supreme Soviet of the Lithuanian SSR elected Vytautas Landsbergis as its chairman and restored Lithuania's prewar name of the Republic of Lithuania. It then changed its name to the Supreme Council of the Republic of Lithuania, and formally declared the re-establishment of Lithuanian independence. The act was approved at 10:44 pm by 124 members of the council while six abstained. There were no votes against.

The Act

The Supreme Council took the line that Lithuania's original declaration of independence in 1918 was still valid, and considered the Act to be a reassertion of an independence that still legally existed under international law. It was based on the premise that Smetona never resigned, and Merkys' takeover of the presidency was illegal and unconstitutional. Lithuania's official position on the matter since then has been that all subsequent acts leading up to the Soviet annexation were ipso facto void.

Aftermath

The Act of the Re-Establishment of the State of Lithuania served as a model and inspiration to other Soviet republics. However, the issue of independence was not immediately settled and recognition by other countries was not certain.

Mikhail Gorbachev called the Act of Independence illegal and the USSR demanded revocation of the Act and began applying sanctions against Lithuania including an economic blockade. In addition, on January 13, 1991 Soviet forces stormed the LRT building in Vilnius along with the Vilnius TV Tower. Unarmed civilian Lithuanians confronted Soviet soldiers. Fourteen people were killed and seven hundred injured in what became known as January Events.

On May 31, 1990, the Supreme Soviet of Moldavian SSR voted to recognize the Restoration of the Independence of Lithuania. The Parliament of Moldavia was the first legislature in the world to recognize Lithuania's independence, although Moldavia was still part of the Soviet Union. The Moldavian Supreme Soviet promised to establish an embassy to Lithuania in the near future.

On February 11, 1991, the Icelandic parliament voted to confirm that Iceland's 1922 recognition of Lithuanian independence was still in full effect, as it never formally recognized the Soviet Union's control over Lithuania, and that full diplomatic relations should be established as soon as possible. In response, the Soviet Union recalled its ambassador to Iceland. Iceland was later followed by Denmark, Slovenia, Croatia (then a constituent republic of Yugoslavia), and Latvia. Denmark's ambassador to Lithuania arrived on August 26; he was the first foreign diplomat accredited to Lithuania after its declaration of independence. 

On August 26, 1991, Lithuanian border guards were posted at border crossings between Lithuania and Russia, and the Republic of Lithuania began issuing visas. The first visas were issued to members of the Lithuanian Opera Company, a Chicago-based group of Americans of Lithuanian descent who had arrived to perform for three weeks in the country. At first, citizens of the Soviet Union and anyone with a visa for the Soviet Union automatically qualified for a visa upon arrival to Lithuania; later, the country instituted its own visa rules. 

After the failed August Coup, Lithuanian independence recognition was reconfirmed by the United States on September 2. President George H. W. Bush announced that if the Soviet Union were to use armed force against Lithuania, the U.S. would react accordingly. Bush's administration said that he had been waiting to recognize Lithuanian independence until the Supreme Soviet of the Soviet Union did so first, but Bush later decided he could not wait any longer.

Finally, on September 6, 1991 Lithuania's independence was recognized by the State Council of the Soviet Union. Its recognition of Lithuania's independence was quickly followed by several countries including China, India, and Belarus as well as Turkmenistan and Uzbekistan.

On September 17, 1991, the United Nations admitted Lithuania as a member. On the same day, the United Nations also admitted Estonia, Latvia, Marshall Islands, Micronesia, North Korea, and South Korea as members.

On March 29, 2004, Lithuania became a member of NATO. On May 1, 2004, Lithuania also became a member of the European Union. NATO. The country banned displays of Soviet and Nazi symbols in 2008.

See also
Act of Independence of Lithuania, the Act of February 16, 1918
On the Restoration of Independence of the Republic of Latvia - A similar Act in the Latvian SSR
Estonian Restoration of Independence - A similar act in the Estonian SSR
State continuity of the Baltic states

References

Further reading
The Oxford Companion to Politics of the World (p. 69, 70), Joel Krieger (editor), Oxford University, 1993.
Background Notes on Countries of the World 2003; September 2003, Lithuania, (p. 12)
The Baltic Revolution; Estonia, Latvia, Lithuania and The Path to Independence, Anatol Lieven, 1993.
Collapse of an Empire, Lessons for Modern Russia (pp. 175, 214, 217–219), Yegor Gaidar, Brookings Institution, 2007.
Why did the Soviet Union collapse, Understanding Historical Change, (p. 152–155), Robert Strayer, M.E.Sharpe, 1998.

History of Lithuania (1990–present)
Lithuania, Re-Establishment
1990 in Lithuania
1990 in the Soviet Union
Singing Revolution
Dissolution of the Soviet Union
March 1990 events in Europe
1990 documents